Asso di Picche was an Italian comic series featuring an eponymous masked crime fighter who combats an international crime syndicate known as the Band of Panthers - the action occurs all over the world, but chiefly in a dark, melancholic version of San Francisco. The series was created in 1945 by Mario Faustinelli, Alberto Ongaro, and Hugo Pratt.  The editorial work was done by Faustinelli, Ongaro wrote the text, while Pratt did the initial pencil drawings which were later revised in ink by Faustinelli. It was terminated in 1949. 

The illustrative style of Pratt in Asso di Picche has been compared to that of Milton Caniff in Terry and the Pirates (1934).  The character itself is thought to have been inspired by both The Phantom (1936) by Lee Falk and Ray Moore and The Spirit (1940) by Will Eisner.

References

External links 
 Asso di Picche (fumetto italiano) (in Italian).
 Faustinelli - Ongaro - Pratt: "L'Asso di Picche" (in Italian).

Italian comic strips
1945 comics debuts
1949 comics endings
Crime comics
Comics by Hugo Pratt
Comics set in San Francisco
Vigilante characters in comics